Three ships of the Royal Navy have been named HMS Benbow, after Admiral John Benbow:

  was a 74-gun third-rate ship of the line, built in 1813. She was converted to a coal hulk in 1859 and broken up in 1895.
  was an  launched in 1885 and scrapped in 1909.
  was an  launched in 1913. She fought in the Battle of Jutland and was scrapped in 1931.

See also
 HMS Benbow, a Royal Navy shore establishment in Trinidad.

Royal Navy ship names